"Dirty Work" is a song by American pop singer Austin Mahone. The song was released in the United States as a digital download on July 1, 2015. It was written and produced by The Monsters and the Strangerz, with additional songwriting from Mahone, Sean Douglas and Talay Riley. From 2017, Japanese comedian Blouson Chiemi started to use the song as the background music in a popular comedy routine, which led to the song peaking on the Japan Hot 100 Chart at number 4. In October 2017, the song was certified Platinum in Japan.

Background and release 
In late June, Austin revealed the "Dirty Work" single artwork on Twitter, and announced that it would be released to iTunes on July 10, 2015. It was premiered on radio the next day, and given an early iTunes release on July 1, 2015.

On November 17, 2015, Mahone released a "Dirty Work" remix featuring T-Pain for free on his official SoundCloud page.
In 2017, "Dirty Work" became a sleeper hit in Japan after comedienne Blouson Chiemi began using it in her "Career Woman" comedy routine. After seeing her comedy routine, Mahone offered to collaborate with her, and a "Dirty Work" remix featuring Blouson Chiemi was released on iTunes on June 8, 2017.

Composition
"Dirty Work" is a "bouncy, funky jam" that Mahone describes as having "a Bruno Mars / "Uptown Funk" type of vibe."

Critical reception
The song received positive reviews. Jason Lipshutz of Billboard called it Mahone's "best and most ambitious single to date". Mike Wass of Idolator called it a 'retro-leaning banger' and likened it to hits by Bruno Mars and Justin Timberlake, while Fuse's Jeff Benjamin wrote "At times the guitars sound a bit like the ones in Michael Jackson's "Black or White."

Music video
The music video for "Dirty Work" was filmed in April, 2015. Mahone stated in an interview with WiLD 94.9 that the video would be in black and white. However, Mahone later re-shot the video with an entirely new concept, and this original version of the video was never released.

In early July, Mahone filmed a second video for the song, inspired by the American TV version of The Office. This version of the video was released on July 27, 2015. In it, Mahone plays the office heart-throb, who is pursuing the sexy new girl. It includes a cast of fellow workers, who goof around and dance with Mahone throughout the video, with The Office style interviews to camera inter-cut throughout.

Track listing and formats

Digital download and streaming
 "Dirty Work" – 3:07
Digital download and streaming (Blouson Chiemi Remix)
 "Dirty Work" (Blouson Chiemi Remix) - 2:56

Dirty Work (+Remix)
 "Dirty Work" - 3:09
 "Dirty Work" (Bon Dance Remix) - 3:47
 "Dirty Work" (EDM Remix) - 3:52
 "Dirty Work" (Instrumental) - 3:08

Charts

Weekly charts

Year-end charts

Certifications

Release history

References

2015 songs
Cash Money Records singles
Republic Records singles
Songs written by Sean Douglas (songwriter)
Songs written by Talay Riley
Songs written by Jordan Johnson (songwriter)
Songs written by Stefan Johnson
Songs written by Marcus Lomax
Songs written by Eskeerdo
Song recordings produced by the Monsters & Strangerz
Austin Mahone songs
Songs written by Austin Mahone